Miquelon Lake Provincial Park is a provincial park in Alberta, Canada, about 65 kilometres southeast of the city of Edmonton. The park features several lakes, the largest of them being Miquelon Lake.

History 
In 1920, the area which is now Miquelon Lake Provincial Park was designated as a bird sanctuary. However, in 1926, a 16 ft. deep canal was excavated to divert the lake water in the opposite direction to the Lyseng reservoir in the Battle River watershed, to serve the city of Camrose. This resulted in a significant reduction of the lake's water, severely damaging both the lake and its watershed. In 1944, the city of Camrose attempted to extract more water from the lake, but found it to be of poor quality. Although the canal was reportedly closed, the provincial government continues to drain water from Miquelon Lake. The park was finally established on May 20, 1958.

Activities 
 Beach: On the shallow western side, a beach is located, along with phones, playgrounds, paved paths, and several other amenities. The beach has a designated swimming and recreation  area, although swimming is not recommend due to high bacterial count, and generally low water levels.
 Birding: Many species of birds stop at this location in their migration patterns.
 Boating: There is a hand-launch at the park. The largest lake, Miquelon Lake, is available for boating.
 Camping: Numerous campsites are available, in multiple different blocks. There are options for electricity campsites and electricity-less campsites.
 Sports: Ice skating, cross-country skiing paths, hiking trails, snowshoeing paths, and a golf course are located at or near the park.
 Farmers' Market: In the months of July and August a farmers' market is held at the Park Centre.

References

External links

Camrose County
Provincial parks of Alberta